is a Japanese Nippon Professional Baseball player with the Yomiuri Giants in Japan's Central League. As a rookie in 2008, Ochi was a key member of a young Giants bullpen that came within three outs of a Japan Series title.  Ochi was the losing pitcher in Game 7 of that series against the Saitama Seibu Lions, after he hit Lions second baseman Yasuyuki Kataoka.  Kataoka then stole second and third, then was driven home to tie the game.  Ochi put another man on and was ultimately charged with what proved to be the series-winning run.

External links

Living people
1983 births
Baseball people from Ehime Prefecture
Waseda University alumni
Nippon Professional Baseball pitchers
Japanese baseball players
Yomiuri Giants players